The 1987 Japanese Formula 3000 Championship was contested over 9 rounds. 17 different teams, 22 different drivers, 2 different chassis and 3 different engines competed.

Calendar

Final point standings

Driver

For every race points were awarded: 20 points to the winner, 15 for runner-up, 12 for third place, 10 for fourth place, 8 for fifth place, 6 for sixth place, 4 for seventh place, 3 for eighth place, 2 for ninth place and 1 for tenth place. No additional points were awarded. All results count.

Complete Overview

R=retired DIS=disqualified

Super Formula
Formula 3000